The 1984 Giro di Lombardia was the 78th edition of the Giro di Lombardia cycle race and was held on 13 October 1984. The race started in Milan and finished in Como. The race was won by Bernard Hinault of the La Vie Claire team.

General classification

References

1984
Giro di Lombardia
Giro di Lombardia
1984 Super Prestige Pernod International